José Manuel Hernández (1853 – 25 August 1921) was a popular Venezuelan caudillo, army general, congressman, presidential candidate and cabinet member who was also involved in numerous insurrections.

Biography

Hernández was born in Caracas, Venezuela.

Called El Mocho (the hand-less) after his right hand was crippled as a result from a battle wound, he is particularly well known for his numerous rebellions and imprisonments and for the modernity of his presidential campaign, which involved rallies, meetings, campaign posters and tours around the country.

In 1911 he was exiled by the Juan Vicente Gómez regime; subsequently he lived in Puerto Rico, Cuba and the United States, where he died in New York City in 1921.

References 

1853 births
1921 deaths
People from Caracas
Venezuelan people of Canarian descent
Government ministers of Venezuela
Members of the Venezuelan Chamber of Deputies
Venezuelan generals
Venezuelan soldiers